Latar is a village in Chehel Shahid Rural District, in the Central District of Ramsar County, Mazandaran Province, Iran. At the 2006 census, its population was 445, in 128 families.

References 

Populated places in Ramsar County